The Death of the West is a 2001 book by paleoconservative commentator Patrick J. Buchanan.

The Death of the West may also refer to:

 Death of the West (album), a 2002 Babylon Whores album
 The Death of the West (album), a 1994 Sol Invictus album